Emma Best may refer to:
 Emma Best (journalist), American journalist
 Emma Best (politician), British politician